1889 was the 103rd season of cricket in England since the foundation of Marylebone Cricket Club (MCC). The number of balls per over was increased from four to five. The four-ball over had been used since time immemorial.

Earlier in the year, on 12 and 13 March, South Africa versus England at Port Elizabeth was the start of cricket in South Africa at both Test and first-class level.  Domestic first-class matches began at the end of the same year.  The England team, captained by future Hollywood actor C Aubrey Smith, played two Tests on the inaugural tour, at Port Elizabeth and Cape Town, winning both by comfortable margins.  Lancashire spinner Johnny Briggs had match figures of 15–28 at Cape Town.

Honours
 Champion County – Surrey, Lancashire, Nottinghamshire (shared)
 Wisden (Nine Great Professional Batsmen) – Bobby Abel, Billy Barnes, Billy Gunn, Louis Hall, Robert Henderson, Maurice Read, Arthur Shrewsbury, Frank Sugg, Albert Ward

Playing record (by county)

Leading batsmen (qualification 20 innings)

Leading bowlers (qualification 1,000 balls)

Notable events
 In May and June, the flooding and waterlogging of Lord's caused three games to be abandoned without a ball bowled - the first recorded instance in English cricket.
 Declarations of an innings were permitted for the first time on the third day of a match. The first captain to declare was John Shuter against Gloucestershire on 8 June.
 20 to 22 June – Middlesex and Yorkshire break the 1876 record for the highest aggregate of runs in a first-class match in England, totalling 1,295 over the three days to surpass the previous English record by 78 runs.
 The use of an unofficial points system by the "Cricket Reporting Agency", which had begun in 1887, reached farcical levels when Surrey, Lancashire and Nottinghamshire finished tied on 10.5 points. This led to the devising in December of the first official County Championship in 1890.

Notes
An unofficial seasonal title sometimes proclaimed by consensus of media and historians prior to December 1889 when the official County Championship was constituted.  Although there are ante-dated claims prior to 1873, when residence qualifications were introduced, it is only since that ruling that any quasi-official status can be ascribed.
Between 1887 and 1889 an unofficial point system of 1 point for a win and 0.5 points for a draw, devised by the "Cricket Reporting Agency", was used to determine the unofficial "Champion County"
The match between Middlesex and Kent at Lord's was completely washed out

References

Annual reviews
 James Lillywhite’s Cricketers’ Annual (Red Lilly), Lillywhite, 1890
 John Wisden's Cricketers' Almanack 1890

External links
 CricketArchive – season summaries

1889 in English cricket
English cricket seasons in the 19th century